Lafayette or La Fayette, is originally a surname or a toponym coming from the Occitan words la faieta and that designates a beech forest.

Due to the fame of American Revolutionary War commander Gilbert du Motier, Marquis de Lafayette, Lafayette is also a given name in the United States.

Notable people with the name include:

Surname
 Andrée Lafayette (1903-1989), French actress
 Bernard Lafayette (born 1940), American civil rights activist and organizer
 Ivan Lafayette (born 1930), longtime member of the New York State Assembly (1977–2008)
 James Lafayette (1853–1923), pseudonym of James Stack Lauder, portrait photographer, 
 James Armistead Lafayette (c. 1760–1830), aka James Armistead, African-American Revolutionary War spy
 Nathan LaFayette (born 1973), former National Hockey League player
 Oliver Lafayette (born 1984), American professional basketball player
 Ross Lafayette (born 1985), English professional footballer
 Ruby Lafayette (1844–1935), American film actress

Given name
 Lafayette C. Baker (1826–1868), American investigator and Union spy during the American Civil War; promoted for his part in apprehending Lincoln's assassins 
 Lafayette Bunnell (1824–1903), American physician, explorer and author
 Lafayette Caskey (1823–1881), a member of the Wisconsin State Assembly
 La Fayette Eastman (1819-1898), a member of the Wisconsin State Assembly
 LaFayette Emmett (1822–1905), American lawyer, second attorney general of the Minnesota Territory and first chief justice of the state supreme court
 Lafayette S. Foster (1806–1880), American senator from Connecticut and Connecticut Supreme Court judge
 Lafayette Gilchrist (born 1967), American jazz pianist and composer
 La Fayette Grover (1823–1911), Democratic politician and lawyer from the U.S. state of Oregon
 Lafayette Guild (1826–1870), United States Army and Confederate States Army surgeon; pioneer in the study of yellow fever
 Lafayette Head (1825–1897), Colorado legislator and first Lieutenant Governor of Colorado
 Lafayette Holbrook (1850–1941), mayor of Provo, Utah 
 Lafayette Ronald Hubbard (1911–1986), better known as L. Ron Hubbard, science fiction author and founder of Scientology
 Lafayette Lane (1842–1896), Representative from Oregon
 Lafayette Leake (1919–1990), blues and jazz pianist, organist, vocalist and composer 
 Lafayette S. Lafe McKee (1872–1959), American actor who appeared in more than 400 films from 1912 to 1948.
 LaFayette Fayette McMullen (1805–1880), American politician and banker; Virginia state senator, member of the U.S. and Confederate House of Representatives, and Territorial Governor of Washington 
 Lafayette McLaws (1821–1897), Confederate general during the American Civil War
 Lafayette Mendel (1872–1935), American biochemist
 Lafayette F. Mosher (1824–1894), American politician and judge in Oregon
 Lafayette Lever (born 1960), also known as "Fat Lever", former professional basketball player
 LaFayette L. Patterson (1888–1987), Representative from Alabama
 Lafayette Russell (1905–1978), college and National Football League running back
 Lafayette Young (1848–1926), newspaper reporter and editor, and briefly Republican Senator from Iowa

See also
 House of La Fayette
 Lafe, a list of people with the given name, often as a short form of Lafayette
 Lafayette (disambiguation)

Masculine given names